The Dodger Dog is a hot dog named after the Major League Baseball franchise that sells them (the Los Angeles Dodgers). It is a 10-inch pork wiener wrapped in a steamed bun. The hot dog is sold at Dodger Stadium located in Los Angeles, California. According to the National Hot Dog and Sausage Council, the projected number of 2011 season hot dogs sold at Dodger Stadium was 2 million—establishing Dodger Dogs as the leader in hot dog sales of all those sold in Major League Baseball ballparks.

There are two lines for Dodger Dog vendors: steamed or grilled. The vendors of the grilled dogs are typically located near the back wall of the stadium so that the smoke does not overwhelm the baseball fans. The grilled Dogs are considered the "classic" version. Until 2021, they were known as "Farmer John Dodger Dogs". Starting with the 2021 MLB Los Angeles Dodgers season, the iconic "Dodger Dog" is being supplied to Dodger Stadium by Vernon, California-based Papa Cantella's.

Background
The success of the Dodger Dog has spawned a small chain of restaurants in the Southern California area. One such restaurant named Dodger Dogs can be found in Universal City, California. The Dodger Dog is also available in the "Super Dodger Dog" variation, which is made of 100% beef as opposed to 100% pork. It is believed that Dodger Dogs were first called "Dodger Dogs" in 1958 when the Dodgers first came to Los Angeles from Brooklyn. The Dodger Dogs that are now sold to the public in Southern California supermarkets are made by Papa Cantella's, a southern California sausage maker. In 2011, the Dodgers introduced a Mexican-themed "Doyer Dog" which are made with chili, salsa, jalapeños, and condiments replacing the standard ketchup and mustard on a typical hot dog. 

The Dodger Dog is also served at Chickasaw Bricktown Ballpark in Oklahoma City, Oklahoma, the home of the Dodgers AAA affiliate Oklahoma City Dodgers. A concession area called the "Dog Pound" serves hot dogs from stadiums around the country including the Fenway Frank, Cincinnati Cheese Coney, Milwaukee Brat, and The Red Hot Chicago Dog. The Dodger Dog was not, however, served at the Dodgers' spring training ballpark, Camelback Ranch, during the team's first spring training at the park.  This was changed for the 2010 Spring Training season where the Dodger Dog was either cooked on a hot dog roller or steamed.

Creator
Thomas Arthur created the "Dodger Dog" during his 29 years (1962–1991) as the food concessions manager at Dodger Stadium. Originally, the 10 inch dog was sold as a "Foot Long", but Thomas Arthur decided truth in advertising was the best path.  He approached Walter O'Malley, majority owner of the Dodgers, and asked if the Hot Dog could be called the "Dodger Dog". It became such a staple for Dodger fans that actor Vincent Price described its deliciousness in his cookbook, Treasury of Great Recipes. The 10-inch wiener was originally made by the Morrell Meat Company, but Farmer John, one of the Dodgers' chief sponsors, soon took over the hot dog needs of the stadium. Farmer John was purchased by Hormel in 2004. Farmer John was purchased from Hormel by Smithfield Foods in 2017. In 2021, Smithfield and the Dodgers could not agree on a new contract, and the name Farmer John was removed from the product.

In popular culture
 

 Agent Mulder in the episode "E.B.E." of The X-Files claimed that Dodger Dogs gave him "swamp gas".
 In Hancock, Jason Bateman's character, Ray, compares Hancock (Will Smith) to a Dodger Dog, saying "It's something people don't think they're gonna like, but then they try it, and they love it!"
 Johnny Drama in the "Manic Monday" episode of Entourage complains that Vince making him late won't let him get a Dodger Dog.
 In episode #1000 of The Joe Rogan Experience, at 2:08:00 comedian Joey Diaz voices his dislike for Dodger Dogs, likening them to American Airlines's Oatmeal.
 In the second part of the Star Trek: Voyager episode "Future's End" the character Rain Robinson, played by Sarah Silverman, mentions Dodger Dogs when Lieutenant Tuvok brings some as a part of breakfast.

See also

 List of hot dogs
 Dodger Dogs to Fenway Franks

References

External links

 
 

Brand name hot dogs
Los Angeles Dodgers
Baseball culture